Johann Smith (born April 25, 1987, in Hartford, Connecticut) is an American former soccer player who played as a forward, winger, and left back.

Career

Youth
Smith grew up in Bloomfield, Connecticut and attended the Watkinson School, where he played varsity soccer for four years, garnering All-State honors during his junior and senior campaigns. In addition, Smith also enjoyed success on the school's track and field team, once running the 100 meters in 10.5 seconds. Smith also played club soccer for Oakwood Soccer Club. He went on trial during Bolton Wanderers preseason training and impressed by what they saw, Smith was offered a three-year scholarship contract with Bolton's youth academy.

Professional
Smith was named as a Bolton substitute for games against Tottenham Hotspur and Charlton Athletic during the early part of the 2006-07 season. He made his first team debut for Bolton in their League Cup defeat at Charlton Athletic in October 2006, and made his Premier League debut against Manchester United on October 28, 2006, as an 85th-minute substitute for Kevin Davies.

Smith joined Carlisle United on loan in January 2007, making his debut against Doncaster Rovers as a 63rd-minute substitute, replacing Kevin Gall. He scored his first professional goal on April 29, 2007, against Swansea City.

Following his injury playing internationally for the United States, Smith missed all of Bolton's 2007 pre-season, including the Peace Cup in South Korea. When he regained his fitness, he was loaned out to League Two clubs Darlington and Stockport County.

In May 2008 he was one of a number of young players released by Bolton manager Gary Megson. Afterwards, he signed with Toronto FC.

Smith made his MLS debut on August 17, 2008, as a second-half substitute in a 2–0 loss to the New York Red Bulls. Midway through the 2009 MLS season, Smith expressed his desire to leave Toronto. After long talks with the Toronto FC GM, both parties decided leaving was in the best interest of Smith, especially with interest for him coming from a club in Croatia. He was released by Toronto FC on June 16, 2009.

In July 2009 he signed a two-year contract with HNK Rijeka of the Croatian Prva Liga. Smith made his debut the same month in Rijeka's match against Luxembourg side FC Differdange 03 in the Europa League qualifying round when he came off the bench.

After leaving Rijeka, Johann trained with Kalmar FF of the Swedish Allsvenskan for two weeks. On March 23, 2010, Kalmar FF and Smith agreed to a one-year contract. On May 25, Kalmar FF terminated their contract with Smith, stating that he did not live up to their expectations.

Smith was in talks with Rijnsburgse Boys of the Dutch Topklasse league in February 2011. However, a contract was not offered. Later in 2011, Smith continued to trial around Europe, most notably with German sides SV Wacker Burghausen, Kickers Offenbach and 1. FC Magdeburg.

Smith trialed with the New York Red Bulls in the summer of 2012, but was not offered a contract.

In September 2012, Smith signed a contract with Finnish club KuPS of the Veikkausliiga until the end of the season, ending Smith's two-year hiatus from professional soccer.

In 2014, Smith spent time with both Adelaide Raiders and Cumberland United in the NPL South Australia.

On March 17, 2015, Smith signed with Canadian club FC Edmonton of the North American Soccer League.

International
Smith was named to the United States squad for the 2007 FIFA U-20 World Cup in Canada, but a pre-tournament injury forced his removal from the team. He has since played for the United States U-20 team, but he has not been called up to the senior squad.

Career statistics

Notes

Academic career 
Smith has been studying at Stanford University since the winter semester of 2021/2022. He is studying American history as a major in order to qualify for medical studies at Stanford. In addition to his studies, he is a volunteer coach of the men's soccer team at his university.

References

External links
 Profile at Boltonwanderers.us
 
 Profile at veikkausliiga.com

Living people
1987 births
Sportspeople from Hartford, Connecticut
Soccer players from Connecticut
Association football forwards
Bolton Wanderers F.C. players
Carlisle United F.C. players
Darlington F.C. players
Stockport County F.C. players
Toronto FC players
HNK Rijeka players
Kalmar FF players
Kuopion Palloseura players
Adelaide Raiders SC players
Cumberland United FC players
FC Edmonton players
Premier League players
English Football League players
Major League Soccer players
Croatian Football League players
Allsvenskan players
Veikkausliiga players
North American Soccer League players
American expatriate soccer players
American expatriate sportspeople in Canada
American expatriate sportspeople in England
Expatriate footballers in England
Expatriate soccer players in Canada
Expatriate footballers in Croatia
American expatriate sportspeople in Croatia
Expatriate footballers in Sweden
Expatriate footballers in Finland
United States men's under-20 international soccer players
People from Bloomfield, Connecticut
American soccer players
American expatriate sportspeople in Sweden
American expatriate sportspeople in Finland